N1-acetylpolyamine oxidase (hPAO-1, mPAO, hPAO) is an enzyme with systematic name N1-acetylpolyamine:oxygen oxidoreductase (3-acetamidopropanal-forming). This enzyme catalyses the following chemical reaction

 (1) N1-acetylspermidine + O2 + H2O  putrescine + 3-acetamidopropanal + H2O2
 (2) N1-acetylspermine + O2 + H2O  spermidine + 3-acetamidopropanal + H2O2

This enzyme also catalyses the reaction: 
 N1,N12-diacetylspermine + O2 + H2O  N1-acetylspermidine + 3-acetamamidopropanal + H2O2.

References

External links 
 

EC 1.5.3